Bid-e Kalan is a village in Badakhshan Province in north-eastern Afghanistan.

References 

Populated places in Yaftali Sufla District